Changing Seasons may refer to:

Changing Seasons (music video) by A.R. Rahman in Hindi and Tamil versions
Changing Seasons, 1980 jazz album by violinist Billy Bang
Changing Seasons, 2002 jazz album by New Zealand pianist Mike Nock
Changing Seasons (Phil Dwyer album), 2011 Juno Award-winning jazz album by Phil Dwyer